Myersiohyla aromatica is a species of frog in the family Hylidae endemic to Venezuela.
Known only from one tepuy, Cerro Huachamacari, its natural habitats are classed as subtropical or tropical moist montane forests and rivers.

References

Myersiohyla
Amphibians of Venezuela
Amphibians described in 1993
Taxonomy articles created by Polbot
Amphibians of the Tepuis